UFC on ESPN: Santos vs. Teixeira (also known as UFC on ESPN 17 and UFC Vegas 13) was a mixed martial arts event produced by the Ultimate Fighting Championship that took place on November 7, 2020 at the UFC Apex facility in Enterprise, Nevada, part of the Las Vegas Metropolitan Area, United States.

Background
A light heavyweight bout between former UFC Light Heavyweight Championship challengers Thiago Santos and Glover Teixeira headlined this event. They were initially scheduled to headline UFC Fight Night: Waterson vs. Hill. However, the pairing was rescheduled for UFC on ESPN: Holm vs. Aldana after Teixeira tested positive for COVID-19 a week prior to the fight. On September 15, the bout was postponed again as Santos tested positive for the disease.

A middleweight bout between Ian Heinisch and Brendan Allen was previously scheduled to take place earlier this year at UFC on ESPN: Poirier vs. Hooker. However, Heinisch pulled out due to injury and the matchup was scrapped. The pairing was rescheduled and expected to take place at this event. On the day of the event, the UFC announced the bout was once again cancelled due to a positive COVID-19 test involving Heinisch.

A strawweight bout between former UFC Women's Strawweight Championship challenger Cláudia Gadelha and Yan Xiaonan was expected to take place at UFC 253, but a knee injury sustained by Gadelha ruled her out of the bout. The pairing was rescheduled for this event instead.

A lightweight bout between Carlos Diego Ferreira and Drew Dober was initially scheduled to take place in May at UFC Fight Night: Hermansson vs. Weidman. However, the event was cancelled due to the COVID-19 pandemic. The pairing was then rescheduled for this event. In turn, Ferreira pulled out on October 22 due to an illness and the bout was scrapped.

A heavyweight bout between former UFC Heavyweight Champion Andrei Arlovski and Tanner Boser was briefly scheduled for UFC on ESPN: Holm vs. Aldana, but was later moved to this event due to Arlovski being ill.

A heavyweight bout between Marcos Rogério de Lima and Alexander Romanov was initially scheduled to take place a month earlier at UFC Fight Night: Overeem vs. Sakai. However, Lima pulled out after testing positive for COVID-19. The pairing took place at this event.

Philipe Lins was expected to face Don'Tale Mayes in a heavyweight bout at the event. However, it was announced on October 14 that Lins had a knee injury and pulled out of the event. Mayes was then expected to face Roque Martinez a week later at UFC Fight Night: Felder vs. dos Anjos.

A featherweight bout between Jeremy Stephens and Arnold Allen was scheduled to take place at the event. However, Stephens was forced to withdraw from the event in late October citing injury. A replacement could not be found and Allen was also removed.

A bantamweight bout between Khalid Taha and Jack Shore was expected to take place at the event. However, Shore was removed from the bout in late October due to undisclosed reasons and replaced by Raoni Barcelos.

Felipe Colares pulled out of a scheduled bantamweight bout against Gustavo Lopez during fight week as he tested positive for COVID-19. He was replaced by returning veteran Anthony Birchak.

Another bout affected by the COVID-19 pandemic was a bantamweight contest between Sarah Moras and Vanessa Melo, as Moras tested positive for the disease and the pairing was postponed to take place at UFC on ABC: Holloway vs. Kattar.

Results

Bonus awards
The following fighters received $50,000 bonuses.
Fight of the Night: Raoni Barcelos vs. Khalid Taha
Performance of the Night: Giga Chikadze and Alexandr Romanov

See also

 List of UFC events
 List of current UFC fighters
 2020 in UFC

References

UFC on ESPN
2020 in mixed martial arts
2020 in sports in Nevada
Mixed martial arts in Las Vegas
Sports competitions in Las Vegas
November 2020 sports events in the United States